Jean Winn is a female English former international table tennis player.

She won a bronze medal at the 1955 World Table Tennis Championships in the Corbillon Cup (women's team event) with Ann Haydon, Diane Rowe and Rosalind Rowe for England.

See also
 List of England players at the World Team Table Tennis Championships
 List of World Table Tennis Championships medalists

References

English female table tennis players
World Table Tennis Championships medalists